Soma power station (formerly Soma B power station) is a 990 MW coal-fired power station in Soma, Manisa in western Turkey. In 2020 of the 6 units 2 were shut down. Steam from the plant is used for residential heating in the winter.

Illness and deaths due to air pollution
According to Greenpeace Soma is the deadliest power station in Turkey, and deadlier than any power station in Europe, being responsible for 13 thousand lost years of life and 282 thousand lost working days in 2010. Although the company is contracted to install pollution control, such as  desulpherization it may not be financially viable to do so.

Subsidies
In 2018 the plant received 110 million lira capacity payments, and 148 million in 2019 both the largest in Turkey.

Coal
The power station burns lignite from the nearby Soma coal mine.

References

External links 
 WRI ID: WRI1018707
 Soma power station on Global Energy Monitor

Coal-fired power stations in Turkey